Álvaro López Espejo (born 13 February 1952) is a Spanish sprint canoeist who competed in the early 1970s. He was eliminated in the repechages of the K-4 1000 m event at the 1972 Summer Olympics in Munich.

References
Sports-reference.com profile

1952 births
Canoeists at the 1972 Summer Olympics
Living people
Olympic canoeists of Spain
Spanish male canoeists
Place of birth missing (living people)
20th-century Spanish people